Falvashan (also Romanized as Fālvāshan) is a village in Vizhenan Rural District, in the Central District of Gilan-e Gharb County, Kermanshah Province, Iran. According to the 2006 census, its population comprised 31 individuals, in 8 families.

References 

Populated places in Gilan-e Gharb County